Fr. Michael Murphy (c. 1767 – 9 June 1798) was an Irish Roman Catholic priest and United Irishmen leader during the Irish Rebellion of 1798.

While his birthplace in Ireland is undetermined, various locations (such as Ballinoulart, Castleannesley or in Kilnew, County Wexford) are documented as possibilities. He was ordained a priest in 1785 at Wexford after completing hedge school in Oulart. His first parish was at Ballycanew, after Theology and Philosophy studies at the Irish College in Bordeaux in France. Murphy joined the Rebellion on 27 May 1798 following the vandalism of his church by Crown yeomen, despite a mostly pacifist stance by the church leadership.

Murphy proceeded towards battle at Gorey, Kilthomas Hill, then Ballyorril Hill where he met with fellow priest Fr. John Murphy of Boolavogue. Murphy was attacking a gun position on horseback at the Battle of Arklow on 9 June 1798 when he was killed by gunfire. His grave is at Castle Ellis.

References

1760s births
1798 deaths
18th-century Irish Roman Catholic priests
People from County Wexford
United Irishmen